Alfonza "Pep" Hamilton (born September 19, 1974) is an American football coach. He was previously the head coach and general manager of the DC Defenders of the XFL, and the quarterbacks coach for the Los Angeles Chargers, and was most recently the offensive coordinator for the Houston Texans of the National Football League (NFL).

Playing career

College
A native of Charlotte, North Carolina who graduated from West Charlotte High School, Hamilton played quarterback from 1993 to 1996 at Howard University. While at Howard, Hamilton earned the team's scholar-athlete award in 1995 and 1996.

Coaching career

Early career
Hamilton started his coaching career at Howard University, where he served as the team's quarterbacks coach before becoming the team's offensive coordinator.   Hamilton coached in the National Football League for the New York Jets and San Francisco 49ers before taking a position as quarterbacks coach for the Chicago Bears on March 5, 2007.

College coaching
In 2010, Hamilton was hired by the University of New Mexico Lobos after Tee Martin left for the Kentucky Wildcats and was named co-offensive coordinator and wide receivers coach. However, after Ron Turner left Stanford for the Indianapolis Colts, Hamilton left New Mexico before the start of the season to be the wide receivers coach at Stanford. In 2011, he was promoted to offensive coordinator under new head coach David Shaw.

Indianapolis Colts
In 2013, Hamilton was named as the new  offensive coordinator of the Indianapolis Colts, after former OC Bruce Arians left to become the head coach of the Arizona Cardinals. The move reunited Hamilton with former Stanford starting quarterback Andrew Luck, tight end Coby Fleener, and wide receiver Griff Whalen. Hamilton turned down an offer to become the offensive coordinator of the Virginia Tech Hokies, citing a desire to be reunited with his former protege Andrew Luck.

On December 30, 2014 the Oakland Raiders interviewed Hamilton concerning their coaching vacancy, but opted to hire Jack Del Rio.

On November 3, 2015, the Colts fired Hamilton.

Cleveland Browns
In January 2016, Hamilton was named as the associate head coach and quarterbacks coach for the Cleveland Browns.

Michigan Wolverines
In 2017, Hamilton was signed by the Wolverines to a four-year $4.25m contract.

DC Defenders
In February 2019, Hamilton joined the XFL's DC Defenders to be their head coach and general manager for the 2020 XFL season.

Los Angeles Chargers
In April 2020, Hamilton joined the Los Angeles Chargers to be their quarterbacks coach for the 2020 NFL season. He was an integral part of the success of Justin Herbert who won the offensive rookie of the year award.

Houston Texans
On March 10, 2021, Hamilton was hired by the Houston Texans as their passing game coordinator and quarterbacks coach under head coach David Culley. On February 7, 2022, Hamilton was promoted to offensive coordinator. After the season, he was not retained.

Head coaching record

XFL

References

External links
 Michigan Wolverines profile

Living people
1974 births
African-American coaches of American football
African-American players of American football
American football quarterbacks
Chicago Bears coaches
Cleveland Browns coaches
DC Defenders coaches
Houston Texans coaches
Howard Bison football coaches
Howard Bison football players
Indianapolis Colts coaches
Los Angeles Chargers coaches
Michigan Wolverines football coaches
National Football League offensive coordinators
New York Jets coaches
Players of American football from North Carolina
San Francisco 49ers coaches
Stanford Cardinal football coaches
Sportspeople from Charlotte, North Carolina
21st-century African-American sportspeople
20th-century African-American sportspeople